The Czech and Slovak Transatlantic Award (CSTA) is an award given to individuals who have substantially contributed to freedom and democracy in Central Europe, to strengthening of transatlantic relations and integration of Central Europe to Euro-Atlantic Institutions. It is awarded by the Jagello 2000 Association for Euro-Atlantic Cooperation from the Czech Republic and implemented jointly by Jagello 2000 and the Slovak Atlantic Commission since 2012. The Awards are presented two times a year: in spring in Slovakia at the GLOBSEC Bratislava Global Security Forum and in autumn at the NATO Days in Ostrava & Czech Air Force Days in Ostrava, Czech Republic. The recipients are Czech, Slovak and international diplomatic and military personalities.

Honorary Committee 
The CSTA awardees are chosen by the Honorary Committee, created for this purpose from distinguished personalities from the diplomatic, political and military areas of Czechia and Slovakia. Members of the Honorary Committee are:
 Mikuláš Dzurinda, Former Prime Minister and Minister of Foreign Affairs of Slovakia
 Ján Figeľ, Former Special Envoy for the Promotion of the Freedom of Religion or Belief outside the European Union, Former Member of the European Commission
 Štefan Füle, Chairman of the Administrative Board of the Czech China Chamber of Cooperation in Prague, Former European Commissioner for Enlargement and European Neighbourhood Policy
 Rastislav Káčer, Former Chairman of Globsec, Ambassador of the Slovak Republic in Prague
 Jan Kohout, Deputy Minister of Justice, Former Minister of Foreign Affairs of the Czech Republic
 Ivan Korčok, Minister of Foreign and European Affairs of the Slovak Republic
 Gen. Pavel Macko, Former First Deputy Chief of the General Staff of the Armed Forces of the Slovak Republic
 Zbyněk Pavlačík, CEO & Co-Founder of Jagello 2000
 Martin Povejšil, Deputy Minister of Foreign Affairs for Security and Multilateral Issues, Former Permanent Representative of the Czech Republic to the European Union 
 Jiří Schneider, Executive Director of the Aspen Institute Central Europe, Former First Deputy Minister of Foreign Affairs of the Czech Republic
 Gen. (Ret.) Jiří Šedivý, Former Chief of the General Staff of the Armed Forces of the Czech Republic
 Maroš Šefčovič, Vice President of the European Commission, European Commissioner for the Interinstitutional Relations and Foresight

List of Awardees

Artist's design 
Original creation of the renowned Slovak glass-designer Patrik Illo, the Czech and Slovak Transatlantic Award symbolizes the transatlantic link by opposite side edges through transparent glass.

References 

Politics awards
Governance and civic leadership awards
European human rights awards
Humanitarian and service awards
Czech awards
Slovak awards
Awards established in 2012
2012 establishments in the Czech Republic
2012 establishments in Slovakia